The Damascus goat, also known as Aleppo, Halep, Baladi, Damascene, Shami, or Chami, is a breed of goat.  It originated in Middle East countries such as Syria and was imported by Antoniades family and then by the British into Cyprus, where its qualities were improved by breeding.  It is a good producer of both milk and meat and so has been given a high priority by the Food and Agriculture Organization (FAO)

A Damascus goat named Qahr won the first prize for the "Most Beautiful Goat" title at the Mazayen al-Maaz competition in Riyadh on June 13, 2008.

References

Damascus
Dairy goat breeds
Goat breeds originating in Syria
Goat breeds
Meat goat breeds